Emergence is an album by American jazz drummer Whit Dickey recorded in 2009 and released on the Polish Not Two label. It features eight collective improvisations by a trio which includes Japanese pianist Eri Yamamoto and multi-instrumentalist Daniel Carter. Yamamoto and Carter played together previously on Duologue, a collection of duets by the pianist.

Reception 

The All About Jazz by John Sharpe states "It is Yamamoto who provides the best entry point, as she is not afraid to inject structure into the understated free form with her strong rhythmic foundation and bluesy intonation... Dickey is a master of multiple and implied rhythms, shifting in and out of time to a point that a dreamlike quality pervades the music, compounded by his richly detailed touches, making full use of space for dramatic effect."

Track listing 

All compositions by Carter/Yamamoto/Dickey
 "Conversation" – 6:03
 "Get Up" – 8:40 
 "Mobile" – 7:36
 "Convection" – 6:02 
 "Rocker" – 5:54
 "Twirls" – 10:13
 "Last Taste" – 7:49 
 "Plum Blossom" – 7:07

Personnel 

Daniel Carter – reeds, trumpet, flute
Eri Yamamoto – piano
Whit Dickey – drums

References 

2009 albums
Whit Dickey albums